Kybunga is a locality in the Mid North of South Australia. Kybunga school opened in 1881 and closed in 1988. The former Methodist and Uniting church opened in 1886 and is now a private residence.

References

Mid North (South Australia)